Archibald W. Hall was an outfielder in Major League Baseball for the 1879 Troy Trojans and 1880 Cleveland Blues.

Sources

1885 deaths
19th-century baseball players
Major League Baseball outfielders
Baseball players from Massachusetts
Troy Trojans players
Cleveland Blues (NL) players
Syracuse Stars (minor league baseball) players
London Tecumseh players
Year of birth missing